A Solar Spark Lighter or Sunlighter is a pocket-sized stainless steel parabolic mirror, shaped to concentrate sunlight on a small prong holding combustible material at the focal point. A revival of an old gadget marketed as a cigarette lighter by RadioShack in the 1980s, it is a useful hiking and camping accessory as its functioning is not affected by having been soaked by rain or falling in rivers or the sea. To operate it clearly needs sunlight and a small piece of flammable material. Once a glowing spark has been achieved, careful blowing will produce a blaze. Its simplicity, small size and light weight make it a useful item in a survival kit.

See also
 Concentrated solar power

References

Firelighting
Camping equipment
Survival equipment
Solar power